Robert Edwards (16 January 1905 – 4 June 1990) was a British trade unionist and an Independent Labour Party (ILP) and Labour Co-operative politician. He was a Member of Parliament (MP) from 1955 to 1987.

Early life
Born in 1905, in The Dingle, Liverpool.  His mother was a  factory worker and his father was a harbour master. He had two brothers.  One died at sea in the great war and the other was a crane operator on the docks of Liverpool and a musician.  he was one of the youngest Labour councillors in Liverpool, becoming a councillor in 1927, aged 22. He also led an ILP Youth Delegation to the Soviet Union, where he met Leon Trotsky and Joseph Stalin. During the General Strike in 1926 he was a TUC messenger, delivering important messages to the Trades Union Congress from individual unions.

In the Spanish Civil War, he led the ILP Contingent in the Workers' Party of Marxist Unification (POUM) on the Aragon front. They left Spain in May 1937.

Edwards was a leading member of the ILP after it split from the Labour Party in the 1930 and 1940s, serving as the party's Chairman from 1943 to 1948.

Between 1947 and 1971, he was the General Secretary of the Chemical Workers' Union, and was also a member of the Transport and General Workers' Union.

Soviet links
Edwards was the recipient of the Order of the People's Friendship from the Soviet Union.  Former KGB officer, Oleg Gordievsky, who defected to the UK in 1985, claimed that Edwards had been a KGB agent for many years.

Parliamentary career
As an ILP candidate, Edwards unsuccessfully contested Chorley at the 1935 general election, and Stretford at a by-election in 1939 and the Newport by-election in 1945 (where he won 45.5% of the votes).

He was elected as Labour Co-operative MP for Bilston in the 1955 general election.  The constituency was abolished in 1974, so in the February 1974 election, he stood successfully for Wolverhampton South East which covers a similar area.  In 1983, when then 78, he became the oldest sitting British MP.

Edwards stood down aged 82 in 1987 and was succeeded by Dennis Turner.  The former Labour Party leader Michael Foot became the oldest sitting British MP after Edwards' retirement.

Death
Edwards died in June 1990, aged 85, three years after his retirement from Parliament.

References 

 

1905 births
1990 deaths
Councillors in Liverpool
Independent Labour Party National Administrative Committee members
Independent Labour Party parliamentary candidates
Labour Co-operative MPs for English constituencies
British trade union leaders
UK MPs 1955–1959
UK MPs 1959–1964
UK MPs 1964–1966
UK MPs 1966–1970
UK MPs 1970–1974
UK MPs 1974
UK MPs 1974–1979
UK MPs 1979–1983
UK MPs 1983–1987
MEPs for the United Kingdom 1973–1979